Dwight Whitney Morrow (January 11, 1873October 5, 1931) was an American businessman, diplomat, and politician, best known as the U.S. ambassador who improved U.S.-Mexican relations, mediating the religious conflict in Mexico known as the Cristero rebellion (1926–29), but also contributing to an easing of conflict between the two countries over oil. The Morrow Mission to Mexico was an "important step in the 'retreat from imperialism.  He was the father of Anne Morrow and father-in-law of Charles A. Lindbergh.

Life
Of Scotch-Irish descent, Morrow was born in Huntington, West Virginia. He moved with his parents, James Elmore and Clara (Johnson) Morrow to Allegheny, Pennsylvania in 1875. His father James was principal of Marshall College, which is now Marshall University. Morrow's great-great-grandfather Alexander Morrow had immigrated to America from Ireland around the year 1803. Before this, Alexander's ancestors had come from Scotland. After graduating from Amherst College in 1895, Morrow studied law at Columbia Law School and began practicing at the law firm Simpson Thacher & Bartlett in New York City. In 1903, he married Elizabeth Reeve Cutter, his college sweetheart, with whom he had four children. Anne Morrow, his daughter, later married Charles A. Lindbergh, whom she met while her father was Ambassador to Mexico. In 1913, he became a partner at J.P. Morgan & Co., one of the largest, most powerful commercial and investment banks in the United States during this era, financially backing industrial giants such as General Motors and 3M. As a partner at Morgan, he served as a director on many corporate and financial boards.

With the onset of World War I in Europe, the bank lent Britain and France large sums of money, and purchased war materials in the U.S. with it. When the United States joined the War, he became the director of the National War Savings Committee for the State of New Jersey; served abroad as adviser to the Allied Maritime Transport Council, as a member of the Military Board of Allied Supply and as a civilian aide. With his proven logistical and intellectual talents, he was moved to France and made chief civilian aide to General John J. Pershing.

In 1925, Morrow was called upon by his old Amherst College classmate and friend, President Calvin Coolidge, to head the Morrow Board. In September 1925, Coolidge ordered the court-martial of Colonel Billy Mitchell of the Army Air Service for "conduct prejudicial to good order and military discipline." Anticipating adverse political reaction to the trial scheduled for November, and desirous of shaping aviation policy to his own economic views, Coolidge asked Morrow to take charge of a board of military, political, and civilian aviation experts to inquire into all aspects of American aviation. The board's report, published before Mitchell's conviction, recommended the creation of an Air Corps within the Army equivalent to the Signal Corps or Quartermaster Corps, which resulted in the establishment of the U.S. Army Air Corps in July 1926.

Ambassador to Mexico
Morrow was appointed United States Ambassador to Mexico by Coolidge from 1927 to 1930. When Morrow was appointed, the Mexican press had expected that a partner in the financial firm J.P. Morgan was "a return to Dollar Diplomacy."  However, the Coolidge administration planned on changed relations between Mexico and the U.S., which Morrow was to implement. One of Morrow's first acts in Mexico was to change the sign identifying the embassy from "American Embassy" to "United States Embassy"; the appropriation of the words "America" and "American" to refer solely to the United States has long rankled other countries in the hemisphere, including Mexico.

He was widely hailed as a brilliant ambassador, mixing popular appeal with sound financial advice. In 1927, he invited popular humorist-actor Will Rogers and famed aviator Charles Lindbergh for a goodwill tour of Mexico. His daughter, Anne Morrow, was introduced and soon engaged to Lindbergh. To thank the town of Cuernavaca, where Morrow had a weekend house, Morrow hired the Mexican artist Diego Rivera to paint murals in the Palace of Cortez, which are a chronicle of Mexican history from a post-Mexican Revolution point of view.

Morrow initiated a series of breakfast meetings with President Plutarco Elías Calles (1924–1928), at which the two would discuss a range of issues, from the religious uprising, to oil and irrigation. This earned him the nickname "ham and eggs diplomat" in U.S. papers. Morrow also invited Rogers to accompany Morrow and Calles on a tour of Mexico, with Rogers sending favorable human interest stories about Mexico and Mexicans back to U.S. papers, helping to change U.S. perceptions.

In a dispute about Mexican petroleum, a continuing issue between the U.S. and Mexico, with U.S. (and other foreign oil interests) pushing for protection of their interests in Mexico, Morrow helped shape the U.S. response to Mexican government actions regarding oil.

Morrow's best known accomplishment was his mediation of the conflict between the Mexican government and the Catholic Church in Mexico which had escalated into a violent armed conflict, known as the Cristero rebellion. It was in the security interests of the United States not to have turmoil in its southern neighbor, not least because of the exodus of Mexicans to the U.S. in the conflict zones. Morrow's efforts of mediation were successful, He was aided in his efforts by Father John J. Burke of the National Catholic Welfare Conference. The Vatican was also actively suing for peace.

After the 1928 assassination of the newly re-elected President Álvaro Obregón, former president Calles was ineligible to serve again due to term limits, and the Mexican Congress named Emilio Portes Gil as president. In practice, Calles remained in control of power in a period known as the Maximato. Portes Gil as interim president in December 1928, allowed Morrow and Burke to revitalize their peace initiative. Portes Gil told a foreign correspondent on May 1 that "the Catholic clergy, when they wish, may renew the exercise of their rites with only one obligation, that they respect the laws of the land."

Morrow managed to bring the war parties to agreement on June 21, 1929.  His office drafted a pact called the arreglos (agreement) that allowed worship to resume in Mexico and granted three concessions to the Catholics: only priests who were named by hierarchical superiors would be required to register, religious instruction in the churches (but not in the schools) would be permitted, and all citizens, including the clergy, would be allowed to make petitions to reform the laws.  The anticlerical articles of the Constitution of 1917 remained in place, but were not systematically enforced.

Later career
In 1930 he was elected as a Republican to the United States Senate to fill the vacancy caused by the resignation of Walter Evans Edge. At the same time he was elected for the full term commencing March 4, 1931. He served in the Senate from December 3, 1930, until his death in Englewood, New Jersey, on October 5, 1931.

Death
Following a speaking engagement in New York City, Morrow suffered a stroke in his sleep at his home in Englewood, New Jersey and died the next afternoon on October 5, 1931.

A partner at J.P. Morgan, Morrow was one of the richest men in New Jersey. Morrow's death occurred within 30 days of the next election allowing the Republican Governor Morgan Foster Larson to appoint William Warren Barbour as Morrow's successor in the U.S. Senate.

Morrow was interred at Brookside Cemetery in Englewood.

Morrow's will was dated January 24, 1927, and made over $1 million in specific bequests, including $200,000 to Amherst College, $200,000 to Smith College, $100,000 to the Smithsonian Institution, and several other bequests to family and friends. The estate was valued at about $10 million (equivalent to $ million in ). The large $1,000,000 in estate taxes paid to the state of New Jersey enabled the state to balance their books. In addition, a $1 million trust fund had been set up for Anne Morrow Lindbergh in 1929.

Morrow's personal papers are held by the Archives & Special Collections in Robert Frost Library at Amherst College. In 1934, Betty Morrow requested that the British diplomat and writer Harold Nicolson write the definitive biography of her late husband. Nicolson stayed with the family at Englewood and in Maine for several months, drawing on interviews with them, Morrow's partners at J.P. Morgan, and with former Mexican president Plutarco Elias Calles for his book. It was published as Dwight Morrow in October 1935.

Legacy
Dwight Morrow High School, founded in 1932, was named in his honor.  It is a public school serving students in Englewood and Englewood Cliffs, New Jersey.

The World War II Liberty Ship  was named in his honor.

In popular culture
He was portrayed by Bruce Greenwood in the 2012 film For Greater Glory set during the Cristero War.

See also
List of covers of Time magazine (1920s)
List of United States Congress members who died in office (1900–49)
List of people from Morelos, Mexico

Sources
Nicolson, Harold (1975) Dwight Morrow. Ayer Publishing  (originally published 1935)

References

External links

 Dwight W. Morrow Papers  at Amherst College

Dwight Whitney Morrow at The Political Graveyard

1873 births
1931 deaths
Ambassadors of the United States to Mexico
Columbia Law School alumni
Cristero War
New York (state) lawyers
People from Englewood, New Jersey
Politicians from Huntington, West Virginia
New Jersey Republicans
Amherst College alumni
Republican Party United States senators from New Jersey
Politicians from Pittsburgh
JPMorgan Chase people
Lindbergh family
Burials at Brookside Cemetery (Englewood, New Jersey)
People from North Haven, Maine
Simpson Thacher & Bartlett
American people of Scotch-Irish descent
Lawyers from Huntington, West Virginia